Kenneth Milton Reaves (born October 29, 1944) is a former professional American football defensive back who played twelve seasons in the National Football League (NFL) for the Atlanta Falcons, New Orleans Saints, and the St. Louis Cardinals. Reaves is accompanied by a wife and five children, including seven grandchildren.

References

1944 births
Living people
Players of American football from Pennsylvania
Sportspeople from the Pittsburgh metropolitan area
American football safeties
Norfolk State Spartans football players
Atlanta Falcons players
New Orleans Saints players
St. Louis Cardinals (football) players
Western Conference Pro Bowl players
People from Braddock, Pennsylvania